Empty Streets is the debut album by the American house group Late Night Alumni, released through Hed Kandi Records. It was released physically in the UK on August 29, 2005.

The lead single from the album of the same name, "Empty Streets", was released in September 2005 and it features remixes by Haji & Emanuel, Kaskade and Aurora. The Haji & Emanuel remix was featured in Tiësto's compilation album In Search of Sunrise 5: Los Angeles (without crediting it as a remix) and, at the time, became one of the series' most downloaded tracks. Kaskade remade the song for his 2010 album Dynasty.

Track listing

References

External links
 Empty Streets on Discogs

2005 debut albums
Late Night Alumni albums